Óscar García Junyent (born 26 April 1973), known simply as Óscar as a player, is a Spanish former professional footballer, currently a manager.

He was a versatile attacking option as a player, able to feature as an attacking midfielder or a second striker. He spent most of his 14-year professional career with Barcelona, with relative impact, appearing for four other clubs.

In La Liga, Óscar amassed totals of 169 matches and 31 goals over 12 seasons, also representing Espanyol (four years), Albacete, Lleida and Valencia (one apiece). He started working as a manager in 2009, winning league titles in Israel and Austria.

Playing career

Club
Born in Sabadell, Barcelona, Catalonia, Óscar made his professional debut with FC Barcelona, his local team. Between 1992 and 1994 he played five La Liga matches for Barça who were champions each year and, after a loan at fellow top division club Albacete Balompié, he returned and was often used (with good results) in a variety of attacking roles: during the 1995–96 season he scored ten league goals, the most in the squad, even though he only started 11 of his 28 appearances; the team came out empty in silverware, however.

With his role gradually diminishing, Óscar joined Valencia CF for one season, finishing off with Barcelona neighbours RCD Espanyol (teaming up again with brother Roger, for three seasons) and UE Lleida and retiring in June 2005 at the age of 32. On 7 January 2001, whilst playing for the second club against CD Numancia, he was taken to hospital after swallowing his tongue.

Óscar nearly signed for West Ham United in summer 2002, but an eventual deal fell through after a one week's trial and he returned to Espanyol, with whom he never scored more than one goal per season in four years.

International
For Spain, Óscar appeared for the nation at the 1996 Summer Olympics in Atlanta, scoring twice for the eventual quarter-finalists.

Coaching career

Maccabi Tel Aviv and England
In late 2009, García joined former Barcelona coach Johan Cruyff's coaching staff in the Catalonia national team, as the Dutchman had just been appointed. On 22 May 2012 he had his first head coach appointment, signing a two-year contract with Maccabi Tel Aviv FC, where Cruyff's son Jordi acted as sporting director. Exactly one year later, after leading the club to the Israeli Premier League after a ten-year drought, he resigned from his post citing personal reasons.

García was unveiled as the new head coach of Football League Championship side Brighton & Hove Albion on 26 June 2013, replacing Gus Poyet. His first win came on 17 August, 1–0 at Birmingham City; he was November's Manager of the Month, with three wins and a draw. On 12 May 2014, following their play off semi-final defeat to Derby County, his offer of resignation was accepted by the board.

On 2 June 2014, García returned to Maccabi by signing a two-year contract, but left on 26 August due to ongoing war. A week later he was appointed at Watford, replacing Giuseppe Sannino. He was admitted to hospital with minor chest pains on 15 September, forcing him to miss the team's upcoming match with Blackpool. These health problems eventually led to him stepping down, two weeks later.

Red Bull Salzburg

Austrian double holders FC Red Bull Salzburg hired García on 28 December 2015, following the dismissal of Peter Zeidler. His team, for which fellow Spaniard Jonathan Soriano was the main striker, ended the season as national champions. On 19 May the latter scored a hat-trick in a 5–0 cup final victory over FC Admira Wacker Mödling to seal another double.

In 2016–17, Salzburg retained both major honours. After the loss of Soriano, García built the attack around South Korean Hwang Hee-chan.

Saint-Étienne
On 15 June 2017, AS Saint-Étienne signed García to a two-year contract. In November, however, following a 5–0 home loss against Olympique Lyonnais in the Derby du Rhone, he left the club by mutual agreement.

Olympiacos
Olympiacos F.C. announced García as their new manager on 5 January 2018, to replace Takis Lemonis. His contract was terminated by mutual consent on 3 April, following a 1–1 away draw with Levadiakos FC; the side had also been eliminated from the Greek Cup for a third consecutive year, and he was held partially responsible for the lack of dressing room, training and match discipline.

Celta
García had his first head coach experience in Spain in November 2019, when he took over for Fran Escribá at RC Celta de Vigo who stood third from the bottom in the standings. His team stayed up on the last day of the season, as CD Leganés could not win their fixture. 

On 9 November 2020, after only one win in nine matches of the new campaign, García was dismissed.

Reims
García returned to the French Ligue 1 in June 2021, being appointed at Stade de Reims on a three-year deal. Starting with a goalless draw at OGC Nice on 8 August, he won on his fifth attempt with a 2–0 victory at Stade Rennais FC.

García's one full season at the Stade Auguste-Delaune resulted in a 12th-place finish. He was relieved of his duties on 13 October 2022, with his team 15th.

Personal life
García's brothers, Roger and Genís, were also footballers. All youth products of Barcelona, they had however different fates as professionals (especially the latter).

On 17 June 1997, during the final of the Copa Catalunya, all three appeared with the first team in a 3–1 loss to CE Europa.

Managerial statistics

Honours

Player

Club
Barcelona
La Liga: 1992–93, 1993–94, 1997–98, 1998–99
Copa del Rey: 1996–97, 1997–98
UEFA Cup Winners' Cup: 1996–97
UEFA Super Cup: 1997

Valencia
Supercopa de España: 1999

International
Spain U-21
UEFA European Under-21 Championship runner-up: 1996; third place 1994

Manager
Maccabi Tel Aviv
Israeli Premier League: 2012–13

Red Bull Salzburg
Austrian Football Bundesliga: 2015–16, 2016–17
Austrian Cup: 2015–16, 2016–17

Individual
Football League Manager of the Month: November 2013

References

External links

FC Barcelona profile

1973 births
Living people
Sportspeople from Sabadell
Spanish footballers
Footballers from Catalonia
Association football midfielders
Association football forwards
La Liga players
Segunda División players
FC Barcelona Atlètic players
FC Barcelona players
Albacete Balompié players
Valencia CF players
RCD Espanyol footballers
UE Lleida players
Spain youth international footballers
Spain under-21 international footballers
Spain under-23 international footballers
Olympic footballers of Spain
Footballers at the 1996 Summer Olympics
Catalonia international footballers
Spanish football managers
Israeli Premier League managers
Maccabi Tel Aviv F.C. managers
English Football League managers
Brighton & Hove Albion F.C. managers
Watford F.C. managers
Austrian Football Bundesliga managers
FC Red Bull Salzburg managers
Ligue 1 managers
AS Saint-Étienne managers
Stade de Reims managers
Super League Greece managers
Olympiacos F.C. managers
La Liga managers
RC Celta de Vigo managers
Spanish expatriate football managers
Expatriate football managers in Israel
Expatriate football managers in England
Expatriate football managers in Austria
Expatriate football managers in France
Expatriate football managers in Greece
Spanish expatriate sportspeople in Israel
Spanish expatriate sportspeople in England
Spanish expatriate sportspeople in Austria
Spanish expatriate sportspeople in France
Spanish expatriate sportspeople in Greece